Aleksey Butsenin (born 30 March 1976) is a Russian swimmer. He competed in the men's 1500 metre freestyle event at the 1996 Summer Olympics.

References

1976 births
Living people
Russian male swimmers
Olympic swimmers of Russia
Swimmers at the 1996 Summer Olympics
Place of birth missing (living people)
Russian male freestyle swimmers
20th-century Russian people
21st-century Russian people